The KGGB (Korean GPS Guided Bomb) is an air-to-ground glide-guided weapon system, attached to MK-82 conventional general-purpose bomb. The KGGB is capable of striking targets from long-distances and features fire-and-forget capability. It was developed by the Agency for Defense Development (ADD) and LIG Nex1.

Design
The KGGB is a medium-range air-to-ground guided weapon with improved accuracy and range attached with GPS-aided INS guided kits in conventional general purpose bombs. Mission plan data established on the ground is stored in the Pilot Display Unit (PDU) controlling the KGGB, entered into the fighter-mounted KGGB, and after takeoff, if a bomb is dropped within 103 km of the mission area, the bomb will fly in the air and hit the target.

The KGGB kit is equipped with a special wing assembly called Flaperon that can control flight direction, flight altitude and flight speed in the air. This special wing assembly controls the flight direction by adjusting the lift force of the wing during flight, or acts as a flight altitude increase, deceleration or flight altitude decrease, acceleration of flight speed, and serves to fly further away and accurately hit the intended target.

The KGGB's built-in GPS and INS devices allow the bomb to attack targets precisely, and the fighter can safely return to the base immediately after the bomb is dropped, ensuring fighter and pilot viability. The KGGB is a standalone type guided weapon that can be mounted on F-4 Phantom, F-5 Tiger, F-15K, F-16 and FA-50 fighter jets and is remotely controlled by the PDU without the need for further modifications or systems to the aircraft.

Operators

Current operators

 Royal Saudi Air Force

 Republic of Korea Air Force

 Royal Thai Air Force

See also
 Small Diameter Bomb
 GBU-53/B
 AGM-154 Joint Standoff Weapon
 Spice (bomb)

References

Guided bombs of South Korea
Military equipment introduced in the 2010s

External links 
Performance Test Video of KGGB 
Demonstration Video Test of KGGB 
Interview Video of KGGB Developer